The Davey Nunataks are a group of seven nunatak lying  southwest of Mount Harding in the Grove Mountains. They were mapped by Australian National Antarctic Research Expeditions from air photos, 1956–60, and named by the Antarctic Names Committee of Australia for S.L. Davey, a topographic draftsman with the Division of National Mapping, Australian Department of National Development, who contributed substantially to the production of Antarctic maps.

References 

Nunataks of Princess Elizabeth Land